Oakie Doke is a British children's television programme that was broadcast from 1995 to 1997 on the Children's BBC block of the BBC. It was produced by Cosgrove Hall Films and was animated with stop-motion animation. The show ran for two series, each containing 13 episodes.

It also aired on ABC in Australia, TVNZ 2 in New Zealand, RTÉ Two in Ireland as part of their children's block The Den, Dubai 33 in the United Arab Emirates, Net 25 in the Philippines, SABC2 in South Africa, Prime 12 and Premiere 12 in Singapore, TVP1 in Poland, ITV in Thailand, Arutz HaYeladim in Israel, ATV in Hong Kong as part of their children's block Tube Time, BFBS and SSVC Television as part of their children's block Children's SSVC in Germany, Yle TV1 in Finland and PBS in the U.S. as part of a programming block for children called Someday School.

The theme song was composed and sung by Ernie Wood who also composed the incidental music for the series.

Characters
Oakie Doke - The show's titular main character. A man who is made of acorns, twigs and leaves, and is friendly and eager to please.
A Mole family - Mr. Manny, Mrs. Milly, Marcia, Marcus
A Mouse family  (The Corncrackers) - Albert, Rose, Root, Snoot and Hickory (the latter of which is the family's foster-son, as he is a dormouse in contrast to the rest of the family, who are field mice)
A Frog family - Moses, Neptune, Abel and Granny Annie who pushes around a bowl containing three tadpoles, on a pram
A Hedgehog family (The Tickles) - Mrs. Tickle, Lizzie, Libby and Shrimp
A Squirrel family - Rufus, Rain and their baby squirrel called Hazel
Two mischievous grey squirrels - Dave and Denzil who communicate frequently with a cups and string phone.

Plot synopsis
Oakie Doke was a character who lived in an oak tree. His head was an acorn and an Oak leaf covered his upper body. His skin was a light green and he had distinctive rosy cheeks. He was a friendly character and a well-respected member of the forest. He slides down the slide around his treehouse everyday and his friends includes squirrels, mice, toads, hedgehogs and moles.

At the start of the show, one of his friends would ring a bell at the bottom of his tree, which would wake him up. He would then ride a slide that wound round the trunk of the tree to the bottom. The episode then began. On a typical  episode, there would be a friend who had an everyday problem in the woods, and Oakie would immediately come to their aid. There was usually a dilemma, but he would help them and was often assisted by his friends from the forest. Many of the problems that arose were a result of the actions of Dave and Denzil who were known to carry actions out without considering the consequences. However, they usually showed some remorse when Oakie later confronted the pair about their behaviour.

Towards the end of each episode, after Oakie had helped solve the problem, he would state: "Well, it's like I always say...", followed by a rhyming phrase. This phrase would be in relation to the solution of the problem. This was greeted with approving laughter and applause from whoever was present at the time.

Episodes

Series overview

Series 1 (1995)

Series 2 (1997)

Home releases
In 1996, BBC Video released 5 episodes from the first series on VHS.

Then, on 13 January 2003, Cinema Club and Granada Media released 2 DVDs and videos of Oakie Doke, one with Episodes 1–7, and one with Episodes 8-13.

References

External links
Oakie Doke on Toonhound
Oakie Doke and other Cosgrove Hall animations on Blueyonder

British children's animated adventure television series
English-language television shows
BBC children's television shows
British stop-motion animated television series
Plant characters
1995 British television series debuts
1997 British television series endings
1990s British children's television series
1990s British animated television series
Television series by Cosgrove Hall Films
CBeebies